The city of Istanbul is at a geographic crossroads, straddling Europe and Asia Minor, and is divided by a sea lane called the Bosphorus Strait, which joins the Black Sea in the northeast and the Marmara Sea in the southwest. This strait has played a key role in the history of the city.

Operator Companies

Istanbul Sea Buses 
The city's largest ferry operator, Istanbul Sea Buses (İstanbul Deniz Otobusleri, İDO), runs a combination of all-passenger and car-and-passenger ferries to ports on both sides of the Bosphorus, as far as the Black Sea., with additional destinations around the Sea of Marmara. Until it was privatized in April 2011, İDO ran the largest municipal ferry operation in the world.

Turyol 
Another smaller ferry company, Turyol, provides frequent services on routes from Eminönü, Kabataş, Beyoğlu and Karaköy to ports at Üsküdar, Haydarpaşa and Kadıköy, among others.

History
Boats have traversed the waters of the Bosphorus for millennia and until the opening of the first Bosphorus bridge in 1973, were the only mode of transport between the European and Asian halves of Istanbul. They continue to serve as a key public transport link for many thousands of commuters, tourists and vehicles per day.

The first private steam ferries (called vapur in Turkish), crossed the Bosphorus in 1837. The first ferries were wooden paddle boats and were later replaced by iron and steel screw ships.  The city authorities took over the fleet and formed a Şirket-i Hayriye (boat company) in 1945.

Several generations of ferries have served the city since and are now powered by fuel-burning engines. Many were built by the Fairfield Shipbuilding and Engineering Company, Glasgow, Scotland, and have sailed the Golden Horn and the Bosphorus for decades. These white, black and green boats have gone on to become iconic in the modern popular culture of the city. One was featured in the James Bond film From Russia with Love, while more recently a new-generation and therefore historically inaccurate ferry appeared momentarily in the 2012 film Tinker, Tailor, Soldier, Spy, which was set in the 1970s. The last steam-powered ferry ran until 2003. A new generation of boats, designed by Fairfield but built in Istanbul, came into operation in the 2000s, gradually replacing the decades-old fleet.

In the past few decades, the ferries have been partially replaced by the two Bosphorus bridges, the Marmaray rail tunnel, fast catamarans and water taxis.

Passenger Ferries

Total number of passenger boats is 38.
On average, the boats are at least 20 years old.

Gallery

See also
 Public transport in Istanbul
 Istanbul nostalgic tramways
 Sabiha Gökçen airport
 Metrobus (Istanbul)
 Istanbul Airport
 Istanbul Metro
 Istanbul Tram
 Marmaray

References

Additional sources

External links
English-language website of Şehir Hatları (City Boat Lines) company

Ferries of Turkey
Public transport in Istanbul